Castello dell'Acqua is a comune (municipality) in the Province of Sondrio in the Italian region Lombardy, located about  northeast of Milan and about  east of Sondrio.

Castello dell'Acqua borders the following municipalities: Chiuro, Ponte in Valtellina, Teglio.

Demographic evolution

References

External links
 www.comune.castellodellacqua.so.it

Cities and towns in Lombardy